Crime films, in the broadest sense, is a film genre inspired by and analogous to the crime fiction literary genre. Films of this genre generally involve various aspects of crime and its detection. Stylistically, the genre may overlap and combine with many other genres, such as drama or gangster film, but also include comedy, and, in turn, is divided into many sub-genres, such as mystery, suspense or noir.

Screenwriter and scholar Eric R. Williams identified crime film as one of eleven super-genres in his Screenwriters Taxonomy, claiming that all feature-length narrative films can be classified by these super-genres.  The other ten super-genres are action, fantasy, horror, romance, science fiction, slice of life, sports, thriller, war and western.  Williams identifies drama in a broader category called "film type", mystery and suspense as "macro-genres", and film noir as a "screenwriter's pathway" explaining that these categories are additive rather than exclusionary.  Chinatown would be an example of a film that is a drama (film type) crime film (super-genre) that is also a noir (pathway) mystery (macro-genre).

Source of plots 
Crime films are often based on real events or are adaptations of plays or novels, or a remake or adoption of a previous film. Some plots are original and entirely fictional. For example, the 1957 film version of Witness for the Prosecution is an adaptation of a 1953 stage play of that name, which is in turn based on Agatha Christie's short story, originally published in 1933. The film version was remade in 1982, and there have been other adaptations. However, each of these media has its own advantages and limitations, which in the case of cinema is the time constraint.

Plays and films 
Witness for the Prosecution is a classic example of a courtroom drama. In a courtroom drama, a charge is brought against one of the main characters, who claims to be innocent. Another major part is played by the lawyer (in England a barrister) representing the defendant in court and battling with the public prosecutor. They may enlist the services of a private investigator to find out what really happened and who the real perpetrator is. However, in most cases it is not clear at all whether the accused is guilty of the crime or not—this is how suspense is created.

Often, the private investigator storms into the courtroom at the last minute in order to bring a new and crucial piece of information to the attention of the court. This type of literature lends itself to the literary genre of drama focused more on dialogue (the opening and closing statements, the witnesses' testimonies, etc.) and little or no necessity for a shift in scenery. The auditorium of the theatre becomes an extension of the courtroom. When a courtroom drama is filmed, the traditional device employed by screenwriters and directors is the frequent use of flashbacks, in which the crime and everything that led up to it is narrated and reconstructed from different angles.

A classic courtroom drama is U.S. playwright Reginald Rose's Twelve Angry Men (1954), which is set in the jury deliberation room of a New York court. Eleven members of the jury, aiming at a unanimous verdict of "guilty", try to get it over with as quickly as possible. And they would really succeed in achieving their common aim if it were not for the eighth juror (played by Henry Fonda in the 1957 movie adaptation), who, on second thoughts, considers it his duty to convince his colleagues that the defendant may be innocent after all, and who, by doing so, triggers much discussion, confusion, and anger.

Subgenres

Crime action 
Crime action films are those that favor violence. According to Jule Selbo, the crime and action genres are intertwined: "the films could not exist in their popular form without the other on equal footing—therefore they are working in tandem". Examples include the Fast & Furious film series.

Crime comedy 
Crime comedy films are a hybrid of the crime film and the comedy that play with the conventions of the crime film and may introduce aspects of dark humor. Generally, they feature dim-witted criminals or crime sprees that are bumblingly executed or are presented in a lighthearted manner. The genre had a resurgence in popularity in the independent film scene of the 1990s, which combined the clichés of the crime thriller with comic appropriations.

Crime drama 
Crime dramas are films that focus on the moral dilemmas of criminals. They differ from crime thrillers as the films generally focus on a grimmer and more realistic portrayal of the criminal world over violence and gunplay sequences. Occasionally these films begin with the flashier elements of the crime thriller such as in The Godfather, Goodfellas, and Once Upon a Time in America to develop into more contemplative narratives.

Crime thriller 
Crime thrillers focus on the exciting elements of both successful and unsuccessful crimes. Unlike police procedurals, they focus on a criminal or a group of criminals rather than law enforcement. These films tend to focus on conspiracies and psychopathology of criminals, and are often violent and nihilistic. Examples include The Killers, The Peacock, Av Mevsimi and Memories of Murder.

Dacoit film 

Dacoit films are a genre of Indian cinema revolving around dacoity. The genre was pioneered by Mehboob Khan's Aurat (1940) and Mother India (1957). Other examples include Gunga Jumna (1961), Sholay (1975) and Bandit Queen (1994).

Gangster film 

Gangster films are films that tell the story from the perspective of gangsters, who are portrayed as idealistic antiheroes. The gangster film is among the oldest genres of films, with examples dating as early as Underworld, Little Caesar and Scarface. After World War II, these films became increasingly violent and menacing with films like Underworld USA. These films also were made outside the United States in Hong Kong, Japan and France.

Heist film 

This film deals with a group of criminals attempting to perform a theft or robbery, as well as the possible consequences that follow. Heist films that are lighter in tone are called caper films. Examples include The Killing, Ocean's 11, Dog Day Afternoon, Reservoir Dogs, and The Town.

Mumbai underworld 

Mumbai underworld is an Indian cinema crime film genre. The genre frequently draws inspiration from real Mumbai underworld gangsters, such as Haji Mastan, Dawood Ibrahim and D-Company. The genre was pioneered by Salim–Javed's Zanjeer (1973) and Deewaar (1975), starring Amitabh Bachchan. Other examples include the Don franchise (19782012), Nayakan (1986), Salaam Bombay! (1988), Parinda (1989), Satya (1998), Company (2002), Black Friday (2004), Slumdog Millionaire (2008) and Once Upon a Time in Mumbaai (2010).

Police procedural 

Police procedurals focus on the police who investigate the actions of criminals, with examples such as He Walked by Night, In the Heat of the Night, Madigan, and The French Connection.

Prison film

The prison film is a type of crime film that focuses on the difficult living conditions in prisons, as well as occasionally focusing on inmates adjusting to life outside of prison.

See also 
 Lists of crime films
 Pre-Code crime films

References

Further reading

 Criminology and Criminal Justice
 Cavender, Gray, and Nancy C. Jurik. "Risky business: Visual representations in corporate crime films." Routledge international handbook of visual criminology (2017): 215-228.

 Hughes, Howard. Crime Wave: The Filmgoers' Guide to the Great Crime Movies (2006) excerpt

 Kadleck, Colleen, and Alexander M. Holsinger. " 'Two Perspectives' on Teaching Crime Films." Journal of criminal justice education 29.2 (2018): 178-197. 

 King, Neal, Rayanne Streeter, and Talitha Rose. "Cultural Studies Approaches to the Study of Crime in Film and on Television." Oxford Research Encyclopedia of Criminology and Criminal Justice (2016). online
 Leitch, Thomas M. Crime Films. (Cambridge UP, 2002), 

 Lenz, Timothy O. Changing Images of Law in Film and Television Crime Stories (Lang, 2003)
 Lichtenfeld, Eric. Action speaks louder: Violence, spectacle, and the American action movie (Wesleyan University Press, 2007).
 Mayer, Geoff. Historical dictionary of crime films (Scarecrow Press, 2012). online
 Rafter, Nicole. Shots in the Mirror: Crime Films and  Society, (2nd ed. Oxford UP, 2006),  online
 Rafter, Nicole. "Crime, film and criminology: Recent sex-crime movies." Theoretical criminology 11.3 (2007): 403-420.
 Rafter, Nicole Hahn, and Michelle Brown. Criminology goes to the movies: Crime theory and popular culture (NYU Press, 2011).
 Ramaeker, Paul. "Realism, revisionism and visual style: The French Connection and the New Hollywood policier." New Review of Film and Television Studies 8.2 (2010): 144-163. online
 Simpson, Philip L. Psycho Paths: Tracking the Serial Killer  through Contemporary American Film and Fiction (University of Southern Illinois Press, 2000).

 Sorrento, Matthew. The New American Crime Film (2012) excerpt
 Spina, Ferdinando. "Crime Films". Oxford Research Encyclopedia of Criminology (Oxford University Press, 2017)

 Welsh, Andrew, Thomas Fleming, and Kenneth Dowler. "Constructing crime and justice on film: Meaning and message in cinema." Contemporary Justice Review 14.4 (2011): 457-476. online

European

 Baschiera, Stefano. "European Crime Cinema and the Auteur." European Review 29.5 (2021): 588-600.

 Chibnall, Steve, and Robert Murphy. British crime cinema (Routledge, 2005).
 Curti, Roberto. Italian Crime Filmography, 1968-1980 (McFarland, 2013).
 Davies, Ann. "Can the contemporary crime thriller be Spanish?" Studies in European Cinema 2.3 (2005). online
 Forshaw, Barry. British crime film: Subverting the social order (Springer, 2012).
 Forshaw, Barry. Euro Noir: The Pocket Essential Guide to European Crime Fiction, Film and TV (2014) excerpt
 Gerhards, Sascha. "Ironizing Identity: The German Crime Genre and the Edgar Wallace Production Trend of the 1960s." in Generic Histories of German Cinema: Genre and its Deviations (Camden House, 2013) pp: 133-155.
 Hansen, Kim Toft, Steven Peacock, and Sue Turnbull, eds. European television crime drama and beyond (Cham: Palgrave Macmillan, 2018).
 Marlow-Mann, Alex. "Strategies of Tension: Towards a Reinterpretation of Enzo G. Castellari’s The Big Racket and the Italian Crime Film." in Popular Italian Cinema (2013) pp: 133-146.
 Peacock, Steven. Swedish crime fiction: Novel, film, television (Manchester University Press, 2015).
 Reisinger, Deborah Streifford. Crime and media in contemporary France (Purdue University Press, 2007).
 Toft Hansen, Kim, Steven Peacock, and Sue Turnbull. "Down these European mean streets: Contemporary issues in European television crime drama." in European television crime drama and beyond (2018) pp: 1-19. online
 Wilson, David, and Sean O’Sullivan. Images of Incarceration: Representations of Prison in Film and Television (Waterside Press, 2004), British emphasis.

 
Film genres